Hassan El-Haddad (5 July 1957 – 30 September 2017) was an Egyptian wrestler. He competed at the 1984 Summer Olympics and the 1988 Summer Olympics.

References

External links
 

1957 births
2017 deaths
Egyptian male sport wrestlers
Olympic wrestlers of Egypt
Wrestlers at the 1984 Summer Olympics
Wrestlers at the 1988 Summer Olympics
Place of birth missing
20th-century Egyptian people